The Tribunal de Contas da União (Federal Court of Accounts, often referred to as TCU) is the Brazilian federal audit office. It is tasked with assisting Congress in its Constitutional incumbency to exercise external audit over the Executive Branch. Its members, called ministers, are appointed by the National Congress and the President of Brazil. The TCU employs a highly qualified body of civil servants to prevent, investigate and sanction corruption and malpractice of public funds, with national jurisdiction.

The Tribunal was created in 1891, although its origins are traced back to the Royal Treasury (Erário Régio), established in 1808 by King John VI. It is, therefore, one of the world's earlier institutions charged with national government accountability. Today, the TCU cooperates with the Comptroller-General of the Union (CGU), which centralizes federal executive internal audit. The Tribunal's work is scrutinized by the Public Ministry.

In 1959 it hosted III INCOSAI, the third triennial convention of the International Organization of Supreme Audit Institutions.

The work executed by the TCU in 2011 produced savings of 14 billion reais (US$7.44 billion) to the Brazilian taxpayer. For each real spent by the court to avert corruption and wasteful spending, 10.5 reais were saved.

References

External links

Legislative branch of Brazil
Government accounting officials
Government agencies established in 1891
Brazil
Supreme audit institutions